This a list of notable people from Antigua and Barbuda.

DJ Red Alert, disc Jockey on Power 105.1 FM and has been recognized as a hip-hop pioneer
Dee-Ann Kentish-Rogers, British-Anguillan Athlete, Barrister, Beauty Queen, Model and Politician who represented Antigua and Barbuda at the 2014 Commonwealth Games in the heptathlon event and was crowned Miss Universe Great Britain 2018 and placed Top 20 at Miss Universe 2018
Joel Anthony, Canadian professional NBA player with Antiguan parentage
Craig "Speedy" Claxton, retired professional basketball player, is of Antiguan parentage
Melvin Claxton, Pulitzer Prize-winning journalist and author
Heather Doram, artists and designer of the national costume
Verton Harris (born 1980), football player
Maurice Hope, world champion boxer
Anna Marie Horsford, actress, of Antiguan parentage
Jazzie B, Musician and Soul II Soul founder
Marianne Jean-Baptiste, actress, of Antiguan parentage
Marie-Elena John, Antiguan writer and former African Development Foundation specialist. Her debut novel, Unburnable, was selected as Best Debut of 2006 by Black Issues Book Review
S. D. Jones, Conrad Efraim former professional wrestler
Jamaica Kincaid, novelist famous for her writings about life on Antigua. Her book A Small Place was banned under the Vere Bird administration
Howard Lindsay, three-time Olympian 1984 (Los Angeles), 1988 (Seoul), and 1996 (Atlanta), in 100 dash and long jump
Viv Richards, West Indian cricketer; the Sir Vivian Richards Stadium in Antigua was named in his honour
Dame Nellie Robinson (1880–1972), national hero and creator of the first school to admit students regardless of race, religion or class.
Kenroy Smith, foot player
Allen Stanford, Texan business tycoon, convicted and sentenced to 110 years in prison for investment fraud
June Ambrose, celebrity fashion designer and stylist
Judge H. B. D. Woodcock (1867–1957), amateur botanist and jurist
Sir William Young FRS, first governor of Dominica
Sir W. Arthur Lewis (1915–1991), Nobel prize-winning economist, of Antiguan parentage
Curtly Ambrose, West Indian cricketer Curtly Ambrose
Rai Benjamin, Hurdler who won Olympic Gold and Silver medals 
Daniel Bailey, Olympic sprinter
Brendan Christian Olympic sprinter
James Grayman, Olympic high jumper
Cejhae Greene, Olympic sprinter
Heather Samuel, Olympic sprinter
Miguel Francis, Sprinter
Zahra Airall, Feminist playwright and filmmaker
Rick James (1939–2018), actor and politician/activist who founded the Free and Fair Elections League and unsuccessfully contested in the 1999 Antigua Freedom Party
Gaston Browne, Prime Minister of Antigua
Baldwin Spencer, former Prime Minister of Antigua
See: Antiguans and Barbudans in the United Kingdom

People who own homes in Antigua

Oprah Winfrey, American television/entertainment icon and entrepreneur, owns a home near Jumby Bay
Eric Clapton, established an Antiguan drug treatment centre; has a home in the south of the island
Giorgio Armani, Italian fashion designer, owns a home near Galley Bay
Calvin Ayre, founder of internet gambling company Bodog Entertainment Group
Allen Stanford, Texan business tycoon, convicted and sentenced to 110 years in prison for investment fraud
Robin Leach, Lifestyles of the Rich and Famous host
Larry Flynt, U.S.-based publisher
Marianne Jean-Baptiste, actress, of Antiguan parentage
Andriy Shevchenko, Ukrainian football player
Silvio Berlusconi, Italian Prime Minister
Timothy Dalton, portrayed James Bond in The Living Daylights and Licence to Kill
Richard Branson, Virgin Atlantic mogul
Ken Follett, British author of Eye of the Needle, owns a house on Jumby Bay

References

Lists of Antigua and Barbuda people